Romain Mencarini is a French rugby league player currently playing for Saint-Esteve XIII Catalan in the Elite One Championship. He previously played for Lézignan Sangliers and Palau Broncos in Elite One Championship. He plays .

Playing career

Saint-Estève XIII Catalan
On 27 Aug 2019 it was reported that he had re-signed for Saint-Estève XIII Catalan in the Elite One Championship

References

1989 births
Living people
French rugby league players
Lézignan Sangliers players
RC Baho XIII players
Rugby league props
Toulouse Olympique players